"You and Me" is a song written by Billy Sherrill and George Richey, and recorded by American country music artist Tammy Wynette.  It was released in July 1976 as the first single and title track from the album You and Me.  The song was Wynette's sixteenth and final number one country hit as a solo artist.  The single stayed at number one for two weeks and spent a total of twelve weeks on the country chart.

Composition

According to Richey in a 1987 interview, the lyrics were inspired by his own (at the time) secret admiration for Wynette, who was still recovering from the fallout of her recent divorce from George Jones.  The pair became close friends and eventually married two years later.

Charts

Weekly charts

Year-end charts

References

1976 singles
Tammy Wynette songs
Songs written by Billy Sherrill
Songs written by George Richey
Song recordings produced by Billy Sherrill
Epic Records singles
1976 songs